Santo Domingo Este is a municipality and the provincial capital of the Santo Domingo province in the Dominican Republic. It has one municipal district (distrito municipal), San Luis.

Santo Domingo Este is across the Ozama River which divides the east and west sections of metropolitan Santo Domingo. This eastern side is more residential and less commercially developed, but it too has experienced growth, though at a slower pace than Santo Domingo itself, with new malls and department stores.

History
Santo Domingo Este was created as a separate municipality in 2001 by Law 163-01, which split the Santo Domingo province from the Distrito Nacional.

Plans for local government separate from the National District were first floated in the 1970s. Congress considered a bill in 1984 that would have created the province of Santo Domingo Oriental, which was rejected on grounds that the creation of a new province would be unconstitutional.

Culture
Santo Domingo Este has a variety of shopping centers, some of them among the largest in the country, such as Mega Centro and Coral Mall. There are also commercial districts in the Venezuela Avenue and St. Vincent de Paul areas, which feature active nightlife and restaurants.

The municipality also includes the Villa Panamericana, a housing complex built for the athletes of the 2003 Pan American Games.

Economy

Santo Domingo Este has three duty-free zones. Hainamosa is home to 11 businesses and 3,000 employees; San Isidro houses 26 businesses and 7,470 employees; and Los Mina has just one business and 6,000 employees. The New Isabela Industrial Park is also located in the municipality.

Companies with a presence in the area include Barceló, Manufacturera Sociedad Industrial, Lácteos Dominicanos, Parmalat, Telever, Codetel, Tricom, as well as construction, energy, and agricultural businesses.

Sectors
When the city was created, these sectors were also divided:

Alma Rosa I
Alma Rosa II
Ana Teresa Balaguer
Arismar
Barrio Ámbar
Barrio La Isla
Brisas del Este
Brisas del Edén
Cansino Adentro
Corales del Este
El Almirante
El Brisal
El Paredón
El Rosal
Ensanche Isabelita
Hainamosa
Invimosa
Invivienda
Jardínes de Alma Rosa
Las Américas
Los Coquitos
Los Farallones
Los Frailes I
Los Frailes II
Los Mameyes
Los Minas
Los Minas Sur
Los Molinos
Los Tres Ojos
Los Trinitarios
Lotificación del Este
Lucerna
Maquitería
Matías Ramón Mella
Mendoza
Milagrosa
Mirador del Este
Ozama
Paraíso Oriental
Ralma
Reparto Alma Rosa
Residencial del Este
Residencial Don Oscar
Residencial Doña Hilaria
Residencial Tito IV
San Isidro
San Luis
Sans Souci
Tropical del Este
Urbanización Italia
Urbanización San Cirilo
Urbanizacion Mi Hogar
Valle del Este
Villa Carmen
Villa Cumbre
Villa Duarte
Villa Eloisa
Villa Olímpica
Villa Faro
Vista Hermosa

Tourist attractions

Faro a Colón
Parque Mirador Este
Acuario
Los Tres Ojos
Hipódromo V Centenario
Agua Splash

References

 
Populated places in Santo Domingo Province
Municipalities of the Dominican Republic